The Hofstra Pride women's basketball team is the basketball team that represents Hofstra University in Hempstead, New York, United States. The school's team currently competes in the Colonial Athletic Association.

History
The Pride has made eight appearances in postseason play, two being in the AIAW Division II National Tournament (1980, 1982) and four being in the WNIT (2006, 2007, 2010, 2011, 2015, 2016). They beat Stony Brook 92–65 for their first ever postseason win before losing to Villanova 71–46 in the next round. They made the Quarterfinals in 2007 and 2016.

Postseason

AIAW College Division/Division II
The Pride, then known as the Flying Dutchmen, made one appearance in the AIAW National Division II Basketball Tournament, with a combined record of 0–1.

References

External links